SACRAL syndrome is a congenital condition characterized by spinal dysraphism, anogenital, cutaneous, renal and urologic anomalies, associated with an angioma of lumbosacral localization.

See also 
 PELVIS syndrome
 List of cutaneous conditions

References

Cutaneous congenital anomalies
Syndromes